Ministry of Justice of China may refer to:

Ministry of Justice of the People's Republic of China, after 1954
Ministry of Justice (Taiwan), or Ministry of Justice of the Republic of China, based in mainland China from 1912 to 1949
Ministry of Justice (imperial China), before 1911